In mathematics and physics, the diamagnetic inequality relates the Sobolev norm of the absolute value of a section of a line bundle to its covariant derivative. The diamagnetic inequality has an important physical interpretation, that a charged particle in a magnetic field has more energy in its ground state than it would in a vacuum.

To precisely state the inequality, let  denote the usual Hilbert space of square-integrable functions, and  the Sobolev space of square-integrable functions with square-integrable derivatives.
Then for almost every ,

In particular, .

Proof 
For this proof we follow Lieb and Loss.
From the assumptions,  when viewed in the sense of distributions and 

for almost every  such that  (and  if ).
Moreover,

So

for almost every  such that . The case that  is similar.

Application to line bundles 
In this situation,  is real-valued, and the covariant derivative  satisfies  for every section .

The above case is of the most physical interest. We view  as Minkowski spacetime.

and the energy of this physical system is 

The diamagnetic inequality guarantees that the energy is minimized in the absence of electromagnetism, thus .

See also

Citations 

Inequalities
Electromagnetism